Anagrus armatus is a species of fairyfly. It has been found in Florida and Puerto Rico.

References

Mymaridae
Insects described in 1887